The Sierra Vista Scenic Byway is an  route through the Sierra National Forest in the U.S. state of California. Many examples of the Sierra’s most distinctive granite domes, meadows and glacial valleys can be seen along the way. The Sierra Vista Scenic Byway begins two miles (3 km) north of the foothill community of North Fork, climbing the western slope of the Sierra Nevada mountain range until its crest, and finally dropping back down into the foothills near Oakhurst.

Route description
The byway begins on Forest Service Road 81 (FS 81) and continues north, loosely paralleling the San Joaquin River. The designation continues west on FS 7; the initial part of it is a dirt road. FS 7 eventually becomes paved again; however, the byway continues southwest onto Sky Ranch Road, which is FS 10 and is initially unpaved. The byway ends at SR 41.

The route is generally open June through October and takes approximately 5 hours to drive.

History
It was designated a National Forest Scenic Byway on July 14, 1989.

Points of interest

Globe Rock
Globe Rock is a large granodiorite, semispherical boulder resting atop a small granodiorite perch. It once served as a gathering place of the Mono Indians as seen by the many acorn grinding mortars in the surrounding granite. Theodore Roosevelt was once photographed here. Globe Rock is a corestone that was formed in place by spheroidal weathering and later exposed by the erosion of the saprolite that once enclosed it.

Fresno Dome
Fresno Dome is a large granite dome that rises from the forest above Soquel Meadow. It is the last designated landmark on the route.

See also

References

External links

The Grizzly Century Bicycle Rally is an annual charity event that climbs over 10,000 vertical feet of the Sierra Vista Scenic Byway
 USDA Forest Service Guide to the Sierra Vista Scenic Byway

Sierra Nevada (United States)
State Scenic Highway System (California)
National Forest Scenic Byways
Sierra National Forest
Roads in Madera County, California
Tourist attractions in Madera County, California
Named highways in California